Sukleji Dam is a proposed dam, to be located across Sukleji River in Kachhi District of Balochistan Province, in southwestern Pakistan.

Specifications
The zoned earth-filled dam will be used for irrigation and hydro power generation and will have an installed capacity of 0.16 MW.

See also

List of dams and reservoirs in Pakistan

Notes

Dams in Balochistan, Pakistan
Kachhi District
Earth-filled dams
Hydroelectric power stations in Pakistan